Jeanne Napoli (October 26, 1938 - October 24, 2010) was an American pop singer, songwriter, actress, and musical performer. She was signed to the Vigor sub-label of New York's De-Lite Records in 1976. She is best known for the disco track, "Let's Make Love".

Career
Jeanne Napoli started out her career as a Copa-Girl in New York City's famous Copacabana. She went on to be a performer in the singing duo The PJ's. She co-wrote the music for Marilyn: An American Fable at the Minskoff Theater Original Musical in 1983. She co-wrote the Air Supply song "I'll Never Get Enough of You" with Gary Portnoy and Judy Quay, which became number 1 in Japan.

She was married to James Napoli.

Selected discography

Albums
Jeanne (1976)
Marilyn: An American Fable (musical, 1983)

Singles
"Forget That Girl" (1976)
"Let's Make Love" (1977)

Songwriting credits
"I'll Never Get Enough of You" (1979) with Gary Portnoy & Judy Quay
"Intergalactic Christmas" (1980) with Douglas P. Frank & Randy Klein
"I Found My Strength in You" (1980) with Douglas P. Frank & Jamie Carr
"Double Trouble" (1980) with Douglas P. Frank
"Sweet Days of Youth" (1980) with Alex & Mark Peskanov
"Feeling Goes On" (1980) with Bruce Gray
"I Found Myself Alone" (1980) with Doug Frank

Other recorded songs
"Mysterious Lover" (from the He Knows You're Alone soundtrack, performed by Napoli, words by Napoli & deBorge Roggeman)

External links

Discogs

References

American disco musicians
American women singer-songwriters
American actresses
1938 births
2010 deaths
American singer-songwriters
21st-century American women